Sourdough or sourdough bread is a bread made by the fermentation of dough using wild lactobacillaceae and yeast. Lactic acid from fermentation imparts a sour taste and improves keeping qualities.

History
In the Encyclopedia of Food Microbiology, Michael Gaenzle writes: "The origins of bread-making are so ancient that everything said about them must be pure speculation. One of the oldest sourdough breads dates from 3700 BCE and was excavated in Switzerland, but the origin of sourdough fermentation likely relates to the origin of agriculture in the Fertile Crescent and Egypt several thousand years earlier", which was confirmed a few years later by archeological evidence. ... "Bread production relied on the use of sourdough as a leavening agent for most of human history; the use of baker's yeast as a leavening agent dates back less than 150 years."

Pliny the Elder described the sourdough method in his Natural History:

Sourdough remained the usual form of leavening down into the European Middle Ages until being replaced by barm from the beer brewing process, and after 1871 by purpose-cultured yeast.

Bread made from 100% rye flour, popular in the northern half of Europe, is usually leavened with sourdough. Baker's yeast is not useful as a leavening agent for rye bread, as rye does not contain enough gluten. The structure of rye bread is based primarily on the starch in the flour as well as other carbohydrates known as pentosans; however, rye amylase is active at substantially higher temperatures than wheat amylase, causing the structure of the bread to disintegrate as the starches are broken down during baking. The lowered pH of a sourdough starter, therefore, inactivates the amylases when heat cannot, allowing the carbohydrates in the bread to gel and set properly. In the southern part of Europe, where panettone is still made with sourdough as leavening, sourdough has become less common in the 20th century; it has been replaced by the faster-growing baker's yeast, sometimes supplemented with longer fermentation rests to allow for some bacterial activity to build flavor. Sourdough fermentation re-emerged as a major fermentation process in bread production during the 2010s, although it is commonly used in conjunction with baker's yeast as leavening agent.

French bakers brought sourdough techniques to Northern California during the California Gold Rush, and it remains a part of the culture of San Francisco today. (The nickname remains in "Sourdough Sam", the mascot of the San Francisco 49ers.) Sourdough has long been associated with the 1849 gold prospectors, though they were more likely to make bread with commercial yeast or baking soda. The "celebrated" San Francisco sourdough is a white bread characterized by a pronounced sourness, and indeed the strain of Lactobacillus in sourdough starters is named Fructilactobacillus sanfranciscensis (previously Lactobacillus sanfranciscensis), alongside the sourdough yeast Kasachstania humilis (previously Candida milleri) found in the same cultures.

The sourdough tradition was carried into Department of Alaska in the United States and the Yukon territory in Canada during the Klondike Gold Rush of 1898. Conventional leavenings such as yeast and baking soda were much less reliable in the conditions faced by the prospectors. Experienced miners and other settlers frequently carried a pouch of starter either around their neck or on a belt; these were fiercely guarded to keep from freezing. However, freezing does not kill a sourdough starter; excessive heat does. Old hands came to be called "sourdoughs", a term that is still applied to any Alaskan or Klondike old-timer. The significance of the nickname's association with Yukon culture was immortalized in the writings of Robert Service, particularly his collection of "Songs of a Sourdough".

In English-speaking countries, where wheat-based breads predominate, sourdough is no longer the standard method for bread leavening. It was gradually replaced, first by the use of barm from beer making, then, after the confirmation of germ theory by Louis Pasteur, by cultured yeasts. Although sourdough bread was superseded in commercial bakeries in the 20th century, it has undergone a revival among artisan bakers and, more recently, in industrial bakeries. In countries where there is no legal definition of sourdough bread, the dough for some products named or marketed as such is leavened using baker's yeast or chemical raising agents as well as, or instead of, a live sourdough starter culture. The Real Bread Campaign calls these products sourfaux.

Manufacturers of non-sourdough breads make up for the lack of yeast and bacterial culture by introducing into their dough an artificially-made mix known as bread improver or flour improver.

Modern culture 

Sourdough baking has a devoted community today. Many devotees share starters and tips via the Internet. Hobbyists often proudly share their work on social media. Sourdough cultures contain communities of living organisms, with a history unique to each individual starter, and bakers can feel an obligation to maintain them. "Many like to think that their sourdough is unique, or their creation, or one that’s been handed down for generations, or been over the Chilkoot Pass, et cetera. Because [starter] is 'alive' some tender hearts feel an obligation to its permanent health and survival." The different yeasts present in the air in any region also enter sourdough, causing starters to change depending on location.

Some devotees find interest in history. Sourdough expert Ed Wood isolated millennia-old yeast from an ancient Egyptian bakery near the pyramids of Giza, and many individual starters, such as Carl Griffith's 1847 starter, have been passed down through generations. "I like the throwback of traditional bread, the things our great grandmothers ate," writes professional baker Stacie Kearney. Some bakers describe starters generations old, though Griffith's seems exceptional.

Sourdough baking became more popular during the COVID-19 pandemic, as increased interest in home baking caused shortages of baker's yeast in stores, whereas sourdough can be propagated at home. 

Sourdough baking requires minimal equipment and simple ingredients – flour, salt, and water – but invites practice. Purism is a part of the appeal. As described by one enthusiast, "If you take flour, water, (wild) yeast and salt, and play around with time and temperature, what comes out of the oven is something utterly transformed." Many bakers feed their starters on elaborate schedules, and many name them. Some approach sourdough as science, attempting to optimize flavor and acidity with careful measurements, experimentation, and correspondence with professional microbiologists. Some lineages of starter are freely shared, and others can be purchased, but many prefer to cultivate their own. Some techniques for doing so are fiercely debated, such as the use of commercial yeast to jump-start a culture while capturing wild yeasts, or adding grapes or milk.

Preparation

Starter
The preparation of sourdough begins with a pre-ferment (the "starter" or "leaven", also known as the "chief", "chef", "head", "mother" or "sponge"), a fermented mixture of flour and water, containing a colony of microorganisms including wild yeast and lactobacilli. The purpose of the starter is to produce a vigorous leaven and to develop the flavour of the bread. In practice there are several kinds of starters, as the ratio of water to flour in the starter (hydration) varies. A starter may be a liquid batter or a stiff dough.

Flour naturally contains a variety of yeasts and bacteria. When wheat flour comes into contact with water, the naturally occurring enzyme amylase breaks down the starch into the sugars glucose and maltose, which sourdough's natural yeast can metabolize. With sufficient time, temperature, and refreshments with new or fresh dough, the mixture develops a stable culture. This culture will cause a dough to rise. The bacteria ferment starches that the yeast cannot metabolise, and the by-products, chiefly maltose, are metabolised by the yeast, which produces carbon dioxide gas, leavening the dough.

Obtaining a satisfactory rise from sourdough takes longer than a dough leavened with baker's yeast because the yeast in a sourdough is less vigorous. In the presence of lactic acid bacteria, however, some sourdough yeasts have been observed to produce twice the gas of baker's yeast. The acidic conditions in sourdough, along with the bacteria also producing enzymes that break down proteins, result in weaker gluten and may produce a denser finished product.

Refreshment of the starter

As it ferments, sometimes for several days, the volume of the starter is increased by periodic additions of flour and water, called "refreshments". As long as this starter culture is fed flour and water regularly, it will remain active.

The ratio of fermented starter to fresh flour and water is critical in the development and maintenance of a starter. This ratio is called the refreshment ratio. Higher refreshment ratios are associated with greater microbial stability in the sourdough. In San Francisco sourdough, the ratio is 40% of the total weight, which is roughly equivalent to 67% of the new-dough's weight. A high refreshment ratio keeps acidity of the refreshed dough relatively low. Acidity levels of below pH 4.0 inhibit lactobacilli and favour acid-tolerant yeasts.

A drier and cooler starter has less bacterial activity and more yeast growth, which results in the bacterial production of more acetic acid relative to lactic acid. Conversely, a wetter and warmer starter has more bacterial activity and less yeast growth, with more lactic acid relative to acetic acid. The yeasts produce mainly CO2 and ethanol. High amounts of lactic acid are desired in rye and mixed-rye fermentations, while relatively higher amounts of acetic acid are desired in wheat fermentations. A dry, cool starter produces a sourer loaf than a wet, warm one. Firm starters (such as the Flemish Desem starter, which may be buried in a large container of flour to prevent drying out) tend to be more resource-intensive than wet ones.

Intervals between refreshments
Refreshment intervals of longer than three days acidify the dough and may change the microbial ecosystem.

The intervals between refreshments of the starter may be reduced in order to increase the rate of gas (CO2) production, a process described as "acceleration." In this process, the ratio of yeasts to lactobacilli may be altered. Generally, if once-daily refreshment-intervals have not been reduced to several hours, the percentage amount of starter in the final dough should be reduced to obtain a satisfactory rise during proof.

Faster starter processes, requiring fewer refreshments, have been devised, sometimes using commercial sourdough starters as inoculants. These starters generally fall into two types. One is made from traditionally maintained and stable starter doughs, often dried, in which the ratios of microorganisms are uncertain. Another is made from microorganisms carefully isolated from Petri dishes, grown into large, homogeneous populations in fermentors, and processed into combined baker's products with numerically defined ratios and known quantities of microorganisms well suited to particular bread styles.

Maintaining metabolically active sourdough with high leavening activity typically requires several refreshments per day, which is achieved in bakeries that use sourdough as sole leavening agents but not by amateur bakers that use the sourdough only weekly or even less frequently.

Local methods
Bakers have devised several ways of encouraging a stable culture of micro-organisms in the starter. Unbleached, unbromated flour contains more micro-organisms than more processed flours. Bran-containing (wholemeal) flour provides the greatest variety of organisms and additional minerals, though some cultures use an initial mixture of white flour and rye or whole wheat flour or "seed" the culture using unwashed organic grapes (for the wild yeasts on their skins). Grapes and grape must are also sources of lactic acid bacteria, as are many other edible plants. Basil leaves are soaked in room-temperature water for an hour to seed traditional Greek sourdough. Using water from boiled potatoes is said to increase the activity of the bacteria by providing additional starch.

The piped drinking water supplied in most urban areas is treated by chlorination or chloramination, adding small amounts of substances that inhibit potentially dangerous micro-organisms but are harmless to animals. Some bakers recommend unchlorinated water for feeding cultures. Because a sourdough fermentation relies on microorganisms, using water without these agents may produce better results. Bottled drinking water is suitable; chlorine, but not chloramines, can be removed from tap water by boiling it for a time, or simply by leaving it uncovered for at least 24 hours. Chlorine and chloramines can both be removed by activated carbon filters.

Adding a small quantity of diastatic malt provides maltase and simple sugars to support the yeasts initially.

Bakers often make loaves with fermented dough from a previous batch (which they call "mother dough", "mother sponge", "chef", or "seed sour") rather than making a new starter every time they bake. The original starter culture may be many years old. Because of their pH level and the presence of antibacterial agents, such cultures are stable and able to prevent colonization by unwanted yeasts and bacteria. For this reason, sourdough products inherently keep fresh for a longer time than other breads, and are good at resisting spoilage and mold without the additives required to retard spoiling of other types of bread.

The flavour of sourdough bread varies from place to place according to the method used, the hydration of the starter and the final dough, the refreshment ratio, the length of the fermentation periods, ambient temperature, humidity, and elevation, all of which contribute to the microbiology of the sourdough.

Baking
The starter must be fed 4 to 12 hours prior to being added to dough, by mixing flour and water to the starter. This creates an active leaven, which should grow in size and is ready to use when it is bubbly and floats in water. The leaven is mixed with flour and water to make a final dough of the desired consistency. The starter weight is usually 13% to 25% of the total flour weight, though formulas may vary. The dough is shaped into loaves, left to rise, and then baked. A number of 'no knead' methods are available for sourdough bread. Due to the length of time sourdough bread takes to proof, many bakers may refrigerate their loaves prior to baking. This process is known as 'retardation' to slow down the proofing process. This process has the added benefit of developing a richer flavoured bread.

Because the rise time of most sourdough starters is longer than that of breads made with baker's yeasts, sourdough starters are generally unsuitable for use in a bread machine. However, sourdough that has been proved over many hours, using a sourdough starter or mother dough, can then be transferred to the machine, utilizing only the baking segment of the bread-making program, bypassing timed mechanical kneading by the machine's paddle. This may be convenient for single loaf production, but the complex blistered and slashed crust characteristics of oven-baked sourdough bread cannot be achieved in a bread making machine, as this usually requires the use of a baking stone in the oven and misting of the dough to produce steam. Furthermore, ideal crust development requires loaves of shapes not achievable in a machine's loaf tin.

Biology and chemistry of sourdough

Sourdough is a stable culture of lactic acid bacteria and yeast in a mixture of flour and water. Broadly speaking, the yeast produces gas (carbon dioxide) which leavens the dough, and the lactic acid bacteria produce lactic acid, which contributes flavor in the form of sourness. The lactic acid bacteria metabolize sugars that the yeast cannot, while the yeast metabolizes the by-products of lactic acid fermentation. During sourdough fermentation, many cereal enzymes, particularly phytases, proteases and pentosanases, are activated through acidification and contribute to biochemical changes during sourdough fermentation.

Lactic acid bacteria

Every starter consists of different lactic acid bacteria which is introduced to the starter through the environment, water, and flour used to create the starter.  The lactic acid bacteria are a group of gram-positive bacteria capable of converting carbohydrate substrates into organic acids and producing a wide range of metabolites. Organic acids, including propionic, formic, acetic acid, and lactic acid, create an unfavorable environment for the growth of spoilage and pathogenic microorganisms.

Lactic acid bacteria commonly found in sourdough is Leuconostoc, Pediococcus, Weissella and other genera. But by far, the most prevalent species belong to the very large and diverse genus, Lactobacillus 

Lactic acid bacteria are aerotolerant anaerobes, which means that though they are anaerobes, they can multiply in the presence of oxygen.

Major lactic acid bacteria in sourdough are heterofermentative (producing more than one product) organisms and convert hexoses by the phosphoketolase pathway to lactate, CO2 and acetate or ethanol; heterofermentative lactic acid bacteria are usually associated with homofermentative (producing mainly one product) lactobacilli, particularly Lactobacillus and Companilactobacillus species.

Yeasts
The most common yeast species in sourdough are Kazachstania exigua (Saccharomyces exiguous), Saccharomyces cerevisiae, K. exiguus and K. humilis (previously Candida milleri or Candida humilis).

Type I sourdough

Traditional sourdoughs used as sole leavening agent are referred to as Type I sourdough; examples include sourdoughs used for San Francisco Sourdough Bread, Panettone, and rye bread. Fructilactobacillus sanfranciscensis was named for its discovery in San Francisco sourdough starters, though it is not endemic to San Francisco. F. sanfranciscensis and Limosilactobacillus pontis often highlight a lactic-acid bacterial flora that includes Limosilactobacillus fermentum, Fructilactobacillus fructivorans, Levilactobacillus brevis, and Companilactobacillus paralimentarius. The yeasts Saccharomyces exiguus, Kasachstania humilis, or Candida holmii usually populate sourdough cultures symbiotically with Fructilactobacillus sanfranciscensis. The perfect yeast S. exiguus is related to the imperfect yeasts C. milleri and C. holmii. Torulopsis holmii, Torula holmii, and S. rosei are synonyms used prior to 1978. C. milleri and C. holmii are physiologically similar, but DNA testing established them as distinct. Other yeasts reported found include C. humilis, C. krusei, Pichia anomaola, C. peliculosa, P. membranifaciens, and C. valida. There have been changes in the taxonomy of yeasts in recent decades. F. sanfranciscensis requires maltose, while C. milleri is maltase negative and thus cannot consume maltose. C. milleri can grow under conditions of low pH and relatively high acetate levels, a factor contributing to sourdough flora's stability.

In order to produce acetic acid, F. sanfrancisensis needs maltose and fructose. Wheat dough contains abundant starch and some polyfructosanes, which enzymes degrade to "maltose, fructose and little glucose." The terms "fructosan, glucofructan, sucrosyl fructan, polyfructan, and polyfructosan" are all used to describe a class of compounds that are "structurally and metabolically" related to sucrose, where "carbon is stored as sucrose and polymers of fructose (fructans)." Yeasts have the ability to free fructose from glucofructans which compose about 1–2% of the dough. Glucofructans are long strings of fructose molecules attached to a single glucose molecule. Sucrose can be considered the shortest glucofructan, with only a single fructose molecule attached. When L. sanfrancisensis reduces all available fructose, it stops producing acetic acid and begins producing ethanol. If the fermenting dough gets too warm, the yeasts slow down, producing less fructose. Fructose depletion is more of a concern in doughs with lower enzymatic activities.

In the first two days of refreshment, atypical genera Enterococcus and Lactococcus bacteria highlighted the doughs. During days 2–5, sourdough-specific bacteria belonging to the genera Lactobacillus, Pediococcus, and Weissella outcompete earlier strains. Yeasts grew more slowly and reached population peaks near days 4–5. By days 5–7, "well-adapted" Lactobacillus strains such as L. fermentum and Lactiplantibacillus plantarum had emerged. At their peaks, yeast populations were in the range of about 1–10% of the lactobacilli populations or 1:10–1:100. One characteristic of a stable dough is that the heterofermentative have outcompeted homofermentative lactobacilli. F. sanfranciscensis has typically not been identified in spontaneous sourdoughs, even after multiple cycles of back-slopping; it was rapidly introduced in wheat sourdoughs, however, when plant materials were used to start the fermentation.

Investigations of wheat sourdough found that S. cerevisiae died off after two refreshment cycles. S. cerevisiae has less tolerance to acetic acid than other sourdough yeasts. Continuously maintained, stable sourdough cannot be unintentionally contaminated by S. cerevisiae.

Type II sourdough
In Type II sourdoughs, baker's yeast or Saccharomyces cerevisiae is added to leaven the dough; L. pontis and Limosilactobacillus panis in association with Lactobacillus species are dominant members of type II sourdoughs. This process was adopted by some in industry, in part, due to simplification of the multiple-step build typical of Type I sourdoughs.

In Type II sourdoughs, yeast growth is slowed or stopped due to higher fermentation temperatures. These doughs are more liquid and once fermented may be chilled and stored for up to a week. They are pumpable and used in continuous bread production systems.

Type III sourdough
Type III sourdoughs are Type II sourdoughs subjected to a drying process, usually either spray or drum drying, and are mainly used at an industrial level as flavoring agents. They are dominated by "drying-resistant [lactic acid bacteria] such as Pediococcus pentosaceus, L. plantarum, and L. brevis." The drying conditions, time and heat applied, may be varied in order to influence caramelization and produce desired characteristics in the baked product.

Types of bread

There are many breads that use techniques similar to that used in the making of sourdough bread. Danish rugbrød (rye bread) is a dense, dark bread best known from its use in the Danish smørrebrød (open-faced sandwiches). The Mexican birote salado started out in the city of Guadalajara as a short French baguette that replaces the yeast with a sourdough fermentation process, yielding a bread that is crunchy outside but soft and savory inside. Amish friendship bread uses a sourdough starter that includes sugar and milk. It is also leavened with baking powder and baking soda. An Amish sourdough is fed with sugar and potato flakes every 3–5 days. German pumpernickel is traditionally made from a sourdough starter, although modern pumpernickel loaves often use commercial yeasts, sometimes spiked with citric acid or lactic acid to inactivate the amylases in the rye flour. Flemish desem bread (the word means 'starter') is a whole-wheat sourdough. In Azerbaijan, whole-wheat sourdough flatbreads are traditionally eaten. In Ethiopia, teff flour is fermented to make injera. A similar variant is eaten in Somalia, Djibouti, and Yemen (where it is known as lahoh). In India, idlis and dosa are made from a sourdough fermentation of rice and Vigna mungo.

Possible fermentation effects

Sourdough bread has a relatively low glycemic index compared with other types of bread. The activity of cereal enzymes during sourdough fermentation hydrolyses phytates, which improves the absorption of some dietary minerals and vitamins, most of which are found in the bran.

Sourdough fermentation reduces wheat components that may contribute to non-celiac wheat sensitivity and irritable bowel syndrome. Sourdough fermentation and lactic acid bacteria may be useful to improve the quality of gluten-free breads, such as by enhancing texture, aroma, and shelf life.

See also

 List of sourdough breads
 Biga, a pre-fermentation technique in Italian baking
 Herman cake
 History of California bread
 Kyselo, Czech soup made from sourdough
 List of microorganisms found in sourdough
 Salt-rising bread
 Sour mash
 Sour rye soup, Polish soup (zurek) made with rye flour soured in the same process that occurs in the forming of sourdough
 Injera

Notes

References

External links
 

 
Doughs
Fermented foods